Labeo kawrus, the Deccan labeo,  is fish in genus Labeo. It is found only in the Krishna River system of the northern Western Ghats in the Indian states of Karnataka and Maharashtra. It occurs in the upper reaches of rivers, in lakes and reservoirs. It can grow to 60 cm in total length. Spawning commences with the onset of south-west monsoon. Its habitat is severely threatened by organic and inorganic pollution, and possibly overexploitation, there is some evidence of declines in populations in the northern part of the species' range.

References 

kawrus
Cyprinid fish of Asia
Fauna of the Western Ghats
Freshwater fish of India
Taxa named by William Henry Sykes
Fish described in 1839